Belgium participated in the Eurovision Song Contest 2017 with the song "City Lights" written by Pierre Dumoulin, Emmanuel Delcourt and Ellie Delvaux. The song was performed by Blanche, which is the artistic name of singer Ellie Delvaux who was internally selected by the Walloon broadcaster Radio Télévision Belge de la Communauté Française (RTBF) in November 2016 to represent the nation at the 2017 contest in Kyiv, Ukraine. The song, "City Lights", was presented to the public on 8 March 2017.

Belgium was drawn to compete in the first semi-final of the Eurovision Song Contest which took place on 9 May 2017. Performing during the show in position 5, "City Lights" was announced among the top 10 entries of the first semi-final and therefore qualified to compete in the final on 23 May. It was later revealed that Belgium placed fourth out of the 18 participating countries in the semi-final with 165 points. In the final, Belgium performed in position 23 and placed fourth out of the 26 participating countries, scoring 363 points.

Background

In 2016, Laura Tesoro represented the country with the song "What's the Pressure", qualifying to the final and placing tenth.

The Belgian broadcaster for the 2017 contest, who broadcasts the event in Belgium and organises the selection process for its entry, was Radio Télévision Belge de la Communauté Française (RTBF). The Belgian participation in the contest alternates between two broadcasters: the Flemish Vlaamse Radio- en Televisieomroeporganisatie (VRT) and the Walloon RTBF. Both broadcasters have selected the Belgian entry using national finals and internal selections in the past. In 2015, RTBF internally selected a contestant from the reality singing competition The Voice Belgique to represent the nation, while in 2016, VRT organised the national final Eurosong in order to select the Belgian entry. On 23 May 2016, RTBF confirmed Belgium's participation in the 2017 Eurovision Song Contest and internally selected both the artist and song.

Before Eurovision

Internal selection 
The Belgian entry for the 2017 Eurovision Song Contest was selected via an internal selection by RTBF. On 22 November 2016, the broadcaster announced that they had selected Ellie Delvaux (Blanche) to represent Belgium in Kyiv. Blanche was a participant in the fifth series of the reality singing competition The Voice Belgique. It was also announced that Blanche had worked with lead singer of the group Roscoe, Pierre Dumoulin, on the song she would perform at the contest, which was selected by a twelve-member committee from 20 proposals submitted by record companies. Among artists that were previously rumoured to be selected for the competition included other participants in the fifth series of The Voice Belgique Olivier Kaye and Pierre Lizée. 

The song, "City Lights", was set to be presented to the public on 8 March 2017 during a press conference held in Brussels, however a snippet was leaked the night before through Spotify. The song was written by Blanche herself along with Pierre Dumoulin and Emmanuel Delcourt, and was first written in imaginary language before being selected for the Eurovision Song Contest with the title being the only English words that were sung. The music video for the song, filmed in Brussels and directed by Brice VDH and Simon Vanrie, was released on the same day of the presentation. Following the snippet leak, Belgium rose 23 places in the betting odds and was considered by bookmakers to be the second most likely country to win the contest.

Promotion
Blanche made several appearances across Europe to specifically promote "City Lights" as the Belgian Eurovision entry. On 2 April, Blanche performed during the London Eurovision Party, which was held at the Café de Paris venue in London and hosted by Nicki French and Paddy O'Connell. Between 3 and 6 April, Blanche took part in promotional activities in Tel Aviv, Israel where she performed during the Israel Calling event held at the Ha'teatron venue. On 8 April, Blanche performed during the Eurovision in Concert event which was held at the Melkweg venue in Amsterdam, Netherlands and hosted by Cornald Maas and Selma Björnsdóttir. On 15 April, Blanche performed during the Eurovision Spain Pre-Party, which was held at the Sala La Riviera venue in Madrid, Spain.

At Eurovision 

According to Eurovision rules, all nations with the exceptions of the host country and the "Big Five" (France, Germany, Italy, Spain and the United Kingdom) are required to qualify from one of two semi-finals in order to compete for the final; the top ten countries from each semi-final progress to the final. The European Broadcasting Union (EBU) split up the competing countries into six different pots based on voting patterns from previous contests, with countries with favourable voting histories put into the same pot. On 31 January 2017, a special allocation draw was held which placed each country into one of the two semi-finals, as well as which half of the show they would perform in. Belgium was placed into the first semi-final, to be held on 9 May 2017, and was scheduled to perform in the first half of the show.

Once all the competing songs for the 2017 contest had been released, the running order for the semi-finals was decided by the shows' producers rather than through another draw, so that similar songs were not placed next to each other. Belgium was set to perform in position 5, following the entry from Albania and before the entry from Montenegro.

The two semi-finals and the final was broadcast in Belgium by both the Flemish and Walloon broadcasters. VRT broadcast the shows on één and Radio 2 with commentary in Dutch by Peter Van de Veire. RTBF televised the shows on La Une with commentary in French by Jean-Louis Lahaye and Maureen Louys; the first semi-final aired on a 90-minute delay on La Une. The final was also broadcast by RTBF on VivaCité with commentary in French by Olivier Gilain. The Belgian spokesperson, who announced the top 12-point score awarded by the Belgian jury during the final, was Fanny Gillard.

Semi-final

Blanche took part in technical rehearsals on 30 April and 4 May, followed by dress rehearsals on 8 and 9 May. This included the jury show on 8 May where the professional juries of each country watched and voted on the competing entries.

The Belgian performance featured Blanche in a long black dress designed by Johanne Riss and performing a choreographed hand routine on stage. The stage was in dark blue colours with the use of white lights, and the LED screens displayed white laser lines and shapes as well as a round object imagery that shattered into pieces. Two off-stage backing vocalists joined Blanche during the performance: Jess Peet and Susanna Cork. Susanna Cork would go on to represent the United Kingdom in 2018 under the pseudonym SuRie.

At the end of the show, Belgium was announced as having finished in the top 10 and subsequently qualifying for the grand final. It was later revealed that Belgium placed fourth in the semi-final, receiving a total of 165 points: 125 points from the televoting and 40 points from the juries.

Final 
Shortly after the first semi-final, a winners' press conference was held for the ten qualifying countries. As part of this press conference, the qualifying artists took part in a draw to determine which half of the grand final they would subsequently participate in. This draw was done in the reverse order the countries appeared in the semi-final running order. Belgium was drawn to compete in the second half. Following this draw, the shows' producers decided upon the running order of the final, as they had done for the semi-finals. Belgium was subsequently placed to perform in position 23, following the entry from Ukraine and before the entry from Sweden.

Blanche once again took part in dress rehearsals on 12 and 13 May before the final, including the jury final where the professional juries cast their final votes before the live show. Blanche performed a repeat of his semi-final performance during the final on 12 May. Belgium placed fourth in the final, scoring 363 points: 255 points from the televoting and 108 points from the juries.

Voting
Voting during the three shows involved each country awarding two sets of points from 1-8, 10 and 12: one from their professional jury and the other from televoting. Each nation's jury consisted of five music industry professionals who are citizens of the country they represent, with their names published before the contest to ensure transparency. This jury judged each entry based on: vocal capacity; the stage performance; the song's composition and originality; and the overall impression by the act. In addition, no member of a national jury was permitted to be related in any way to any of the competing acts in such a way that they cannot vote impartially and independently. The individual rankings of each jury member as well as the nation's televoting results were released shortly after the grand final.

Below is a breakdown of points awarded to Belgium and awarded by Belgium in the first semi-final and grand final of the contest, and the breakdown of the jury voting and televoting conducted during the two shows:

Points awarded to Belgium

Points awarded by Belgium

Detailed voting results
The following members comprised the Belgian jury:
 Jean-François Pottier (jury chairperson)Head of Music Nostalgie Belgique
 Kevin Coccoteacher, singer, composer, communication officer
 Tiffany Baworowski (Typh Barrow)singer, songwriter, composer
 Étienne BaffreyFounder and Director of radio antipode, teacher at IAD-Radio
 Marie Benmokaddem (Mia Lena)singer, student

References 

2017
Countries in the Eurovision Song Contest 2017
Eurovision